Kairo McLean is a Canadian reggae musician from Toronto, Ontario, who won the Juno Award for Reggae Recording of the Year at the Juno Awards of 2022 for his EP Easy Now.

References

21st-century Black Canadian male singers
Canadian reggae musicians
Musicians from Toronto
Living people
Year of birth missing (living people)